Abdul Wahed Sarābi, (born 1926) is a former government minister and was one of the vice presidents of Mohammad Najibullah.

He was the minister of planning in the Kingdom of Afghanistan from 1969 to 1973. 

During the communist era of Afghanistan, he served in the Revolutionary council. After the elections of 1988, Sarābi was appointed as one of the vice presidents in May 1988.  His term ended when Najibullah was overthrown in April 1992. 

Sarābi is an ethnic Hazara.

References 

Vice presidents of Afghanistan
Government ministers of Afghanistan
Possibly living people
1926 births
Hazara politicians
People's Democratic Party of Afghanistan politicians